Forrest Henry "Frosty" Sprowl (August 23, 1919 – October 19, 1988) was an American basketball player and coach. An All-American college player at Purdue, he was a head coach at the college level at Lawrence.

Sprowl came to Purdue University from Oblong, Illinois to play for coach Ward Lambert. During the course of his three-year varsity career he was twice named Purdue MVP and earned All-Big Ten Conference honors as a senior. At the close of the season he was named a second-team All-American by Converse.

Following the close of his college career, Sprowl enlisted in the Navy and played with the Great Lakes Naval Training Station under Tony Hinkle. Upon returning to civilian life, he turned to high school coaching, first for his alma mater Oblong High School for a year and then to Monticello High School in Indiana for four seasons. He was then named head basketball coach at Lawrence College (now Lawrence University) in 1951, also taking on assistant football and head tennis coaching duties. He coached at Lawrence for four seasons before resigning for a corporate job.

Sprowl died on October 21, 1988.

References

External links
Basketball Museum of Illinois profile

1919 births
1988 deaths
All-American college men's basketball players
American men's basketball coaches
American men's basketball players
Basketball coaches from Indiana
Basketball players from Indiana
Chicago Bruins players
College men's basketball head coaches in the United States
College tennis coaches in the United States
High school basketball coaches in Illinois
High school basketball coaches in Indiana
Lawrence Vikings football coaches
Lawrence Vikings men's basketball coaches
People from Huntington, Indiana
Purdue Boilermakers men's basketball players
Small forwards